Glenroy Washington (born 17 July 1957), is a Jamaican reggae/soca singer-songwriter, drummer and record producer. Washington made his first hit record "Rockers Not Crackers" in 1978 for the Joe Gibbs Record label; but he did not grace the charts again until the release of the hit "Kindness For Weakness" in 1998.

Discography

Albums 
Brother To Brother (1996), Studio One		
Get Next To Me (1998), VP Records/Joe Frasier	
Think About It (1999), Digital Eclipse Records	
Can't You See  (1999), Charm Records			
Solitary Red Rose (1999), Ruff Stuff Records	
Wandering Stranger  (2000), Studio One	
Number One Girl  (2000), VP Records			
Can't Keep A Good Man Down (2001), Don One Sounds		
Free Up The Vibes (2001), VP Records		
Your Love (2002), VP Records	
Wanna Be Loved (2004), VP Records		
The Right Road, (2004), Jet Star Records
Heart of the City (2006), Don One Sounds	
Destiny (2008), VP Records	
Glen Washington Meets Jah Ruby (2009), Jah Ruby Records/VP Records	
Masterpiece (2012), Zion High Productions	
Vibes (2013), Cou$ins Records
Time of My Live (2017), Love Injection Productions

References

External links
Official Glen Washington Website

Jamaican reggae musicians
Jamaican male singers
Living people
People from Clarendon Parish, Jamaica
VP Records artists
1957 births